Xu Houze (4 May 1934 – 31 August 2021) was a Chinese geodesist and geophysicist, and member of Chinese Academy of Sciences.

Biography 
Xu was born in She County, Anhui, on 4 May 1934. After graduating from Tongji University in 1955, he began graduate work at the Institute of Geodesy and Geophysics, Chinese Academy of Sciences. He joined the Communist Party in May 1983. In June 2006, he was hired as a Distinguished Professor at Shandong University of Technology. In April 2001, he was engaged by Huazhong University of Science and Technology as a professor and director of Institute of Geophysics. On 31 August 2021, he died from an illness in Wuhan, Hubei, aged 87.

He was a delegate to the 6th, 7th and 8th National People's Congress.

Works

Honours and awards 
 1980 Title of National Labor Hero
 1991 Member of the Chinese Academy of Sciences (CAS)
 2004 Science and Technology Progress Award of the Ho Leung Ho Lee Foundation

References 

1934 births
2021 deaths
People from She County, Anhui
Scientists from Anhui
Tongji University alumni
Academic staff of Huazhong University of Science and Technology
Members of the Chinese Academy of Sciences
Delegates to the 6th National People's Congress
Delegates to the 7th National People's Congress
Delegates to the 8th National People's Congress
Chinese geodesists
Chinese geophysicists